Oxnard Sessions, Vol. 1 is the sixth solo album by jazz pianist Mike Garson. It was released in 1990.

Track listing

References

External links
 Billboard.com Review Album review and track listing
 mikegarson.com Official website with Discography

    

Mike Garson albums
1990 albums